The Minister for Corrective Services is a position in the Cabinet of Western Australia, first created in 1983 during the Burke Ministry. The minister was known as the Minister for Prisons until 1987, but since then has been known under its current title.

The current Minister for Corrective Services is Bill Johnston of the Labor Party, who holds the position as a member of the McGowan Ministry. The minister, who has often held other portfolios in addition to protective services, is responsible for the state government's Department of Corrective Services (DCS), which runs the state's corrections system.

List of Ministers for Corrective Services
Seven people have been appointed as Minister for Corrective Services or Minister for Prisons, with the inaugural minister, Joe Berinson, having served for 9 years and 303 days, the longest in the position. Between 1993 and 2006, during the Court–Cowan and Gallop ministries (and during the first months of the Carpenter Ministry), responsibility for the portfolio was transferred to the Minister for Justice, with no separate corrective services minister. Prior to the portfolio's creation in 1983, responsibility for prisons had rested with either the Minister for Justice or the Attorney-General.

In the table below, members of the Legislative Council are designated "MLC". All others were members of the Legislative Assembly at the time of their service. In Western Australia, serving ministers are entitled to be styled "The Honourable", and may retain the style after three years' service in the ministry.

References

Corrective services
Ministers, Corrective Services